In the Mandaean calendar, Dehwa Daimana (written Mandaic transliteration: Dihba ḏ-Yamana, Dihba Daimana, or Dihba Rba ḏ-Daima) is a festival celebrating the birthday of John the Baptist, the Mandaean greatest and final prophet. Children are baptized for the first time during this festival. It is celebrated on the first day of Hiṭia, which is the 11th month of the Mandaean calendar that corresponds to the Hebrew month Kislev.

See also

Nativity of Saint John the Baptist

References

External links
Children's Baptism Day (River and Pool) - Sydney (January 2015). The Worlds of Mandaean Priests.

Observances on non-Gregorian calendars
Mandaean holidays
Saint John's Day
John the Baptist